The Fifty-Nine Icosahedra is a book written and illustrated by H. S. M. Coxeter, P. Du Val, H. T. Flather and J. F. Petrie. It enumerates certain stellations of the regular convex or Platonic icosahedron, according to a set of rules put forward by J. C. P. Miller.

First published by the University of Toronto in 1938, a Second Edition reprint by Springer-Verlag followed in 1982. Tarquin's 1999 Third Edition included new reference material and photographs by K. and D. Crennell.

Authors' contributions

Miller's rules

Although Miller did not contribute to the book directly, he was a close colleague of Coxeter and Petrie. His contribution is immortalised in his set of rules for defining which stellation forms should be considered "properly significant and distinct":

(i) The faces must lie in twenty planes, viz., the bounding planes of the regular icosahedron.

(ii) All parts composing the faces must be the same in each plane, although they may be quite disconnected.

(iii) The parts included in any one plane must have trigonal symmetry, without or with reflection. This secures icosahedral symmetry for the whole solid.

(iv) The parts included in any plane must all be "accessible" in the completed solid (i.e. they must be on the "outside". In certain cases we should require models of enormous size in order to see all the outside. With a model of ordinary size, some parts of the "outside" could only be explored by a crawling insect).

(v) We exclude from consideration cases where the parts can be divided into two sets, each giving a solid with as much symmetry as the whole figure. But we allow the combination of an enantiomorphous pair having no common part (which actually occurs in just one case).

Rules (i) to (iii) are symmetry requirements for the face planes. Rule (iv) excludes buried holes, to ensure that no two stellations look outwardly identical. Rule (v) prevents any disconnected compound of simpler stellations.

Coxeter
Coxeter was the main driving force behind the work. He carried out the original analysis based on Miller's rules, adopting a number of techniques such as combinatorics and abstract graph theory whose use in a geometrical context was then novel.

He observed that the stellation diagram comprised many line segments. He then developed procedures for manipulating combinations of the adjacent plane regions, to formally enumerate the combinations allowed under Miller's rules.

His graph, reproduced here, shows the connectivity of the various faces identified in the stellation diagram (see below). The Greek symbols represent sets of possible alternatives:
 λ may be 3 or 4
 μ may be 7 or 8
 ν may be 11 or 12

Du Val
Du Val devised a symbolic notation for identifying sets of congruent cells, based on the observation that they lie in "shells" around the original icosahedron. Based on this he tested all possible combinations against Miller's rules, confirming the result of Coxeter's more analytical approach.

Flather
Flather's contribution was indirect: he made card models of all 59. When he first met Coxeter he had already made many stellations, including some "non-Miller" examples. He went on to complete the series of fifty-nine, which are preserved in the mathematics library of Cambridge University, England. The library also holds some non-Miller models, but it is not known whether these were made by Flather or by Miller's later students.

Petrie
John Flinders Petrie was a lifelong friend of Coxeter and had a remarkable ability to visualise four-dimensional geometry. He and Coxeter had worked together on many mathematical problems. His direct contribution to the fifty nine icosahedra was the exquisite set of three-dimensional drawings which provide much of the fascination of the published work.

The Crennells
For the Third Edition, Kate and David Crennell reset the text and redrew the diagrams. They also added a reference section containing tables, diagrams, and photographs of some of the Cambridge models (which at that time were all thought to be Flather's). Corrections to this edition have been published online.

List of the fifty nine icosahedra

Before Coxeter, only Brückner and Wheeler had recorded any significant sets of stellations, although a few such as the great icosahedron had been known for longer. Since publication of The 59, Wenninger published instructions on making models of some; the numbering scheme used in his book has become widely referenced, although he only recorded a few stellations.

Notes on the list
Index numbers are the Crennells' unless otherwise stated:

Crennell
In the index numbering added to the Third Edition by the Crennells, the first 32 forms (indices 1-32) are reflective models, and the last 27 (indices 33-59) are chiral with only the right-handed forms listed. This follows the order in which the stellations are depicted in the book.

Cells
In Du Val's notation, each shell is identified in bold type, working outwards, as a, b, c, ..., h with a being the original icosahedron. Some shells subdivide into two types of cell, for example e comprises e1 and  e2. The set f1 further subdivides into right- and left-handed forms, respectively f1 (plain type) and f1 (italic). Where a stellation has all cells present within an outer shell, the outer shell is capitalised and the inner omitted, for example a + b + c + e1 is written as Ce1.

Faces
All of the stellations can be specified by a stellation diagram. In the diagram shown here, the numbered colors indicate the regions of the stellation diagram which must occur together as a set, if full icosahedral symmetry is to be maintained. The diagram has 13 such sets. Some of these subdivide into chiral pairs (not shown), allowing stellations with rotational but not reflexive symmetry. In the table, faces which are seen from underneath are indicated by an apostrophe, for example 3.

Wenninger
The index numbers and the numbered names were allocated arbitrarily by Wenninger's publisher according to their occurrence in his book Polyhedron models and bear no relation to any mathematical sequence. Only a few of his models were of icosahedra. His names are given in shortened form, with "... of the icosahedron" left off.

Wheeler
Wheeler found his figures, or "forms" of the icosahedron, by selecting line segments from the stellation diagram. He carefully distinguished this from Kepler's classical stellation process. Coxeter et al. ignored this distinction and referred to all of them as stellations.

Brückner
Max Brückner made and photographed models of many polyhedra, only a few of which were icosahedra. Taf. is an abbreviation of Tafel, German for plate.

Remarks
No. 8 is sometimes called the echidnahedron after an imagined similarity to the spiny anteater or echidna. This usage is independent of Kepler's description of his regular star polyhedra as his echidnae.

Table of the fifty-nine icosahedra
Some images illustrate the mirror-image icosahedron with the f1 rather than the f1 cell.

See also 
 List of Wenninger polyhedron models – Wenninger's book Polyhedron models included 21 of these stellations.
 Solids with icosahedral symmetry

Notes

References
Brückner, Max (1900). Vielecke und Vielflache: Theorie und Geschichte. Leipzig: B.G. Treubner. . 
WorldCat English: Polygons and Polyhedra: Theory and History. Photographs of models: Tafel VIII (Plate VIII), etc. High res. scans.
 H. S. M. Coxeter, Patrick du Val, H.T. Flather, J.F. Petrie (1938) The Fifty-nine Icosahedra, University of Toronto studies, mathematical series 6: 1–26.
 Third edition (1999) Tarquin  
Wenninger, Magnus J. (1983) Polyhedron models; Cambridge University Press, Paperback edition (2003). .
 A. H. Wheeler (1924) "Certain forms of the icosahedron and a method for deriving and designating higher polyhedra", Proceedings of the International Congress of Mathematicians, Toronto, Vol. 1, pp 701–708.

External links
 Example stellations of the icosahedron
 The fifty nine stellations of the regular icosahedron
 
 
 Stellations of the icosahedron
 George Hart, 59 Stellations of the Icosahedron - VRML 3D files.

Polyhedral stellation
Mathematics books